Platytropius siamensis was a species of schilbid catfish (order Siluriformes) family Schilbeidae. It originated from the Chao Phraya and Bang Pakong Rivers in Thailand. It inhabited lower to middle reaches, mainstreams, tributaries, and larger marshlands. The species has been declared extinct in 2011 by the IUCN Red List of Threatened Species, because despite periodic surveys it has not been encountered since 1975–1977.

P. siamensis was carnivorous, feeding on insects and shrimps. This species was oviparous and eggs were unguarded. It could grow to a length of 20.0 cm (7.9 in) TL.

References

Schilbeidae
Fish of Asia
Fish of Thailand
Taxa named by Henri Émile Sauvage
Fish described in 1883